Pär Lindén (born July 20, 1966) is a Swedish sprint canoer who competed in the early 1990s. At the 1992 Summer Olympics in Barcelona, he was disqualified in the repechages of the K-1 1000 m event.

He is from Nyköpings Kanotklubb.

References
Sports-Reference.com profile

1966 births
Canoeists at the 1992 Summer Olympics
Living people
Olympic canoeists of Sweden
Swedish male canoeists